Evcilik Oyunu is a 1964 Turkish romance film, directed by Halit Refiğ and starring Göksel Arsoy, Belgin Doruk, and Gürel Ünlüsoy.

References

External links

1964 films
Turkish romance films
1960s romance films
Films directed by Halit Refiğ